Emmett/Furla Oasis Films (EFO Films), previously known as Emmett/Furla Films and Oasis Ventures Entertainment separately, is an American film and television production and financing company founded by Randall Emmett and George Furla in 1998. It is notable for funding and producing the films End of Watch, 2 Guns and Lone Survivor. To date, Emmett/Furla Oasis Films has produced more than 80 films which have grossed a total of $1 billion from box office ticket sales worldwide—an average of roughly $13 million per film.

History
The company was founded as Emmett/Furla Films by Randall Emmett and George Furla in 1998. The company was later joined by Dubai-based financier Oasis Ventures Entertainment on July 22, 2013. Emmett said, "We are excited about working with Oasis and really see tremendous synergy. We will continue financing our bigger budget studio co-productions and will be more aggressive than ever in our financing commitments." On June 3, 2014, Emmett/Furla Oasis Films signed a first-look deal with Craig Piligian's Pilgrim Studios to develop and produce docu-series and other unscripted shows.

Nemesis Finance had filed a lawsuit in June 2016 against Randall Emmett/George Furla Productions and also both of them as individuals for breach of contract, fraud and violating the RICO Act. The suit had claimed Nemesis faced losing $1.6 million after producers Randall Emmett and George Furla allegedly misrepresented the amount of debt owed to investors so that they could reduce the residuals reserve deposits required by the major guilds. The case was settled in September 2016. In a joint statement announcing the settlement, the parties said they have "amicably resolved the dispute…and look forward to continuing an ongoing business relationship."

On August 18, 2017, director Jonathan Baker filed a lawsuit against Emmett/Furla Oasis Films over breach of contract and fraudulent inducement over a two way co-finance and production deal. Jonathan Baker claims Randall Emmett told him if he agreed to  Inconceivable he'd return the favor by co-financing and producing a film of Baker's choosing. According to the agreements Baker and Emmett Furla entered into, the suit states, Baker was to be paid $125K for directing fee and it was later agreed that he would also have 49% of the copyright. The producing fee for Baker Entertainment was to be $425K and $550K for Emmett Furla. He entered into the agreement because he was told that in order to do his passion project Fate, he would have to do one of their films first. However, the suit states, shortly after Baker put the $1M into escrow in exchange to become the only equity player, the filmmaker says in the suit that Emmett/Furla began paying themselves $650,000 (each) in producer fees, said Baker, and then brought in more equity players and paid them out first in breach of their initial contract. He is seeking at least $4.5M in damages and has asked for a jury trial. As of August 18, 2017, Martin Barab (attorney for Emmett/Furla) advised The Hollywood Reporter that Baker Entertainment had already been repaid half of its investment in the weeks since the film's June 30 release. He described the suit is "bogus and frivolous."

MoviePass Films
In May 2018, Helios and Matheson Analytics, the parent company of MoviePass, acquired the option to purchase the assets of Emmett/Furla Oasis Films plus gain its executives' expertise in making films for a new subsidiary, MoviePass Films. The new company would be 51% owned by Helios and the remainder by EFO. By early August 2018, Helios and Matheson completed the acquisition of Emmett Furla Oasis Films assets for the MoviePass subsidiary, MoviePass Films. The first film produced under the MoviePass Films was announced to be 10 Minutes Gone starring Bruce Willis, which the first of a three film pact with Willis. In late September 2018, the company acquired equity stakes and co-distribution in two films distributed by Neon to be released soon.

In March 2019, The Boies/Schiller Film Group filed suit on Tuesday, accusing Emmett/Furla Oasis Films of breaching a deal to produce two Escape Plan sequels starring Sylvester Stallone. According to the suit, Boies/Schiller put up a $6 million loan for the $65 million project. The arrangement also gave Boies/Schiller rights to finance and produce the sequels, Escape Plan 2: Hades and Escape Plan: The Extractors. Boies/Schiller alleges that Emmett/Furla Oasis Films breached that agreement, and did not allow Boies/Schiller to put up financing for the sequels. The suit claims Emmett/Furla also failed to pay an executive producing fee on each of the two movies.

Oasis Ventures Entertainment sued MoviePass Films on October 14, 2019 over the theft of films and for lack of consent from Oasis in making the deal with Helios and Matheson.

Today, MoviePass Films is the only company to bear the MoviePass name after MoviePass was shut down in 2020.

Films

 2000 – Escape to Grizzly Mountain
 2000 – Andrew Dice Clay: I'm Over Here Now
 2000 – Held for Ransom
 2001 – Ticker
 2001 – Good Advice
 2002 – Hard Cash
 2002 – Gentlemen of the Hunt
 2002 – Narc
 2002 – Shottas
 2002 – The Badge
 2002 – Try Seventeen
 2003 – Out for a Kill
 2003 – Wonderland
 2003 – Blind Horizon
 2003 – Belly of the Beast
 2004 – A Love Song for Bobby Long
 2004 – Control
 2005 – Edison
 2005 – Submerged
 2005 – Today You Die
 2005 – Before It Had a Name
 2006 – 16 Blocks
 2006 – Mercenary for Justice
 2006 – Lonely Hearts
 2006 – The Wicker Man
 2006 – The Contract
 2006 – Home of the Brave
 2007 – Klopka
 2007 – King of California
 2007 – 88 Minutes
 2007 – Shortcut to Happiness
 2007 – White Air
 2007 – Borderland
 2007 – Finding Rin Tin Tin
 2008 – Rambo (uncredited)
 2008 – Day of the Dead
 2008 – Righteous Kill
 2008 – Major Movie Star
 2009 – Thick as Thieves
 2009 – Streets of Blood
 2010 – Once Fallen
 2010 – Mercy
 2010 – Gun
 2011 – Setup
 2011 – Touchback
 2011 – Catch .44
 2012 – Lay the Favorite
 2012 – Playback
 2012 – Freelancers
 2012 – Fire with Fire
 2012 – End of Watch
 2012 – Alex Cross
 2013 – Broken City
 2013 – Empire State
 2013 – The Frozen Ground
 2013 – Escape Plan
 2013 – 2 Guns
 2013 – Lone Survivor
 2014 – The Prince
 2015 – Vice
 2015 – The Last Witch Hunter (uncredited)
 2015 – 90 Minutes in Heaven
 2015 – Heist
 2015 – Extraction
 2016 – Exposed
 2016 – Marauders
 2016 – Silence
 2017 – Arsenal
 2017 – Aftermath
 2017 – Inconceivable
 2017 – First Kill
 2018 – Acts of Violence
 2018 – A Vigilante
 2018 – Gotti  
 2018 – Escape Plan 2: Hades
 2018 – The Row 
 2018 – Reprisal
 2018 – Backtrace
 2019 – Escape Plan: The Extractors 
 2019 – 10 Minutes Gone 
 2019 – Trauma Center
 2020 – Survive the Night
 2020 – Force of Nature
 2020 – Hard Kill
 2020 – The War with Grandpa
 2021 – Boss Level
 2021 – American Traitor: The Trial of Axis Sally
 2021 – Out of Death
 2021 – Midnight in the Switchgrass
 2021 – Survive the Game
 2021 – Fortress
 2022 – Fortress: Sniper's Eye
 2022 – Wash Me in the River
 2022 – Wrong Place
 2022 – Wire Room
 2022 – Detective Knight: Rogue
 2022 – Detective Knight: Redemption
 2023 – Detective Knight: Independence

Television
 2013–14 – SAF3
 2014–20 – Power

References

External links
 

 
Film production companies of the United States
Companies based in Los Angeles
Mass media companies established in 1998
1998 establishments in California
2018 mergers and acquisitions